The Papua New Guinea Hunters is a professional rugby league club from Papua New Guinea that participates in the Queensland Cup in Australia. Their 2022 official 27-man squad have relocated to Runaway Bay, Gold Coast for the second year in a row. The 2022 Hostplus Cup will be the PNG Hunters' ninth season in rugby league's Queensland Cup after securing their future with a four-year license from 2019 until 2022. They have reappointed Matt Church as their head coach to be supported by Assistant Coaches, Stanley Tepend and Paul Aiton.Two of the Hunters players, Anthony Worot and Sherwin Tanabi were given a one week train and trial with the Cowboys Young Guns and featured in the trial match for the Young Guns against the Mackay Cutters. The Hunters have announced a new strategic player pathways partnership with Dolphins (NRL) that will see four PNG Hunters players joining Dolphins (NRL) for a full NRL pre-season out of which two PNG Hunters players will remain with the Dolphins for the full NRL season commencing in 2023 and play for the Hunters on the weekends when not in the Top 17 team.

Season summary 
 Round 1:

Milestone games

2022 squad

Squad movement

Gains

Losses

Ladder 

 The team highlighted in blue has clinched the minor premiership
 Teams highlighted in green have qualified for the finals
 The team highlighted in red has clinched the wooden spoon

Fixtures

Pre-season

Regular season

Statistics

Representatives
The following players played representative matches in 2022.

References

2022 in Australian rugby league
Queensland Cup
2022 in rugby league by club